Events from the year 1979 in South Korea.

Incumbents
President: Park Chung-hee (until 26 October), Choi Kyu-hah (starting 6 December)
Prime Minister: Choi Kyu-hah (until 6 December), Shin Hyun-hwak (starting 12 December)

Events 
October 3 - Security chief Kim Jae-kyu meets democrat politician Kim Young-sam to discuss the country's future.
December 6 - 1979 South Korean presidential election, confirms former prime minister Choi Kyu-hah as the new president.
December 12 - Coup d'état of December Twelfth: Lieutenant General Chun Doo-hwan, commander of the Security Command, orders the arrest of General Jeong Seung-hwa, ROK Army Chief of Staff, on allegations of involvement in the assassination of President Park Chung Hee. A shoot-out at the Army Headquarters and the Ministry of Defense results in Chun and his fellow eleventh class military academy graduates such as Major General Roh Tae-woo and Major General Jeong Ho-yong taking control of the Korean military.

Films
The Genealogy
Police Story
The Rain at Night
Water Lady

Births
 7 January - Ha Jae-sook, actress
 12 January - Lee Bo-young.
 20 January - Choo Ja-hyun, actress
 21 January - Byung-hyun Kim, baseball player
 30 January - Nam Hyun-joon.
 8 February - MC Sniper.
 16 February - Eric Mun.
 11 March - Jung Yong-hoon.
 6 April - H-Eugene.
 10 May - Lee Hyori.
 13 July - Lee Jaijin.
 28 July - Lee Min-woo. 
 7 August - Kim Jaeduck.
 4 September - MC Mong.
 10 September - MayBee.
 24 September - Kim Jong-min.
 10 October - Kangta.
 2 November - Skull.
 21 November - Kim Dong-wan.
 27 November - Shin Hye-sung.

Deaths
October 26 - President Park Chung-hee, 61 (assassinated)

See also
List of South Korean films of 1979

References

 
South Korea
Years of the 20th century in South Korea
1970s in South Korea
South Korea